Evant Independent School District is a public school district based in Evant, Texas (USA).  It is located in western Coryell County and extends into a southern Hamilton and northern Lampasas counties.  The district operates one school, Evant School serving grades PK-12.  Of note, Evants ISD's rock gym is the largest man made rock wall in  the area.

Academic achievement
In 2009, the school district was rated "academically acceptable" by the Texas Education Agency.

Special programs

Athletics
Evant High School plays six-man football.

See also

List of school districts in Texas

References

External links
 Evant ISD

School districts in Coryell County, Texas
School districts in Hamilton County, Texas
School districts in Lampasas County, Texas